Hossein Kalani (born January 23, 1945, in Tehran) is a retired Iranian football striker who played for Shahin, Persepolis, Paykan Tehran, Shahbaz and the Iran national football team. He was named as one of the members of Persepolis F.C. Hall of Fame and the club thanked him for his great performance during his senior career at Persepolis. The club presented him with a bust of his likeness and named him as one of the twelve great players of Persepolis in the 1970s.

References

External links
Family website 

1945 births
Living people
Iranian footballers
Shahin FC players
Persepolis F.C. players
Paykan F.C. players
Iran international footballers
1968 AFC Asian Cup players
1972 AFC Asian Cup players
AFC Asian Cup-winning players
Sportspeople from Tehran
Footballers at the 1970 Asian Games
Association football forwards
Asian Games competitors for Iran